Tapin may refer to:

 Tapin Regency
 Tapin, Subcarpathian Voivodeship